Robert Heffernan (Australia) was a rugby league footballer in Australia's major competition - the New South Wales Rugby League (NSWRL).

Heffernan, who played for Eastern Suburbs side, played in 79 matches for that club in the years 1957–64. A second rower, he was a member of the Easts side that went down to St George in the 1960 Grand Final.

References

Australian rugby league players
Sydney Roosters players
Living people
Year of birth missing (living people)
Place of birth missing (living people)